"Up Middle Finger" is a song by UK garage duo Oxide & Neutrino, released as the third single from the debut album Execute. It reached the top 10 on the UK Singles Chart, peaking at number 7. It was the duo's third consecutive top 10 hit, and the third of six non-consecutive top 20 hit singles. The song also reached number one on the UK Dance Singles Chart in May 2001.

"Up Middle Finger" contains an excerpt of a live performance of their 2000 number one hit "Bound 4 da Reload", recorded at Radio One Big Sunday Scotland.

Track listing
UK 12" single
A. "Up Middle Finger" – 5:29
B. "Back 2 da Floor" – 4:58

UK CD single
 "Up Middle Finger" (Radio Edit) – 3:35
 "Back 2 da Floor" – 4:58
 "Push Me 2 Hard" – 4:34
 Video

Charts

Weekly charts

References

2001 songs
2001 singles
Oxide & Neutrino songs
East West Records singles